Ludichrist is an American band formed in 1984 in Long Island New York. Their musical style broke from the conventions of New York hardcore by adding aspects of rock, heavy metal and jazz, such as musical interludes and extended guitar solos. Ludichrist is regarded as one of the crossover movement's most prominent groups, alongside D.R.I. Drummer Dave Miranda saw Ludichrist as "crossing into both, punk and metal without firmly belonging into either camp." He observed that "the band was readily influenced by bands around them such as Crumbsuckers and Agnostic Front."

Early history and recordings
Ludichrist was founded in 1984 by Al Batross (aka Al Bazin) and Mark Durnex (aka Mark Kanabrocki) in Long Island, New York. The first line-up included
Batross on drums, Durnex on guitar, Chud on vocals, and Chuck Valle on bass. Batross, the group's first wordsmith named the group and wrote the lyrics for the core group of songs the band played. Durnex wrote the songs. After a few months Tommy Franco (aka Tommy Christ) replaced Chud as vocalist, and the group produced a demo cassette tape titled "Ludichrist" and leveraged it to book performances at regional venues that allowed punk shows.

Guitarist Glen Cummings joined the group as lead guitarist, and after a few rehearsals the group decided to re-record its demo tape to highlight its new, denser sound. The group recorded "Ludichrist, The Demo", and released it on cassette. The cassette features a graphic "cover" and a 16-page illustrated booklet designed by Christ and Cummings. The group purchased a half-page space in Maximum Rock n Roll fanzine to advertise the cassette.

CBGBs Records
The group performed mainly in NYC where there were existing venues and a hardcore scene, but the group first substantial following grew out of a series of shows at Club Anthrax in Connecticut, enabling the group to larger crowds around the east coast region. After a series of energized performances at his venue, CBGBs owner Hilly Kristal asked the group to release a live recording of their show on CBGBs record label which he was reviving through a series of cassette-only releases. Instead of releasing the live performance made on the venues mixing console earlier that day the group waited until the venue was closed then performed a more precise version of its set to only the engineer, Steve. This live recording was expertly combined with crowd sounds from the earlier matinee and released as "CBGBs Live "Off the Board" Ludichrist".

Founding member, Mark Durnex (aka Mark Kanabrocki) who had written most of the first album's songs appears only on the two demos and the CBGBs cassette – leaving the group before Immaculate Deception was recorded. Long Island native and ludichrist fan Joe Butcher joined the group as second guitarist, bringing his active musical sensibilities with him. Joe wrote the album track "Thinking of You" (lyrics by Tommy Christ).

Immaculate Deception

Immaculate Deception features the line-up: Batross, Butcher, Christ, Cummings, and Valle – and was recorded at Platinum Island Sounds in Manhattan with Randy Burns producing. 
The album track "You Can't Have Fun" features guest vocalists Roger Miret, John Connelly, Chris Notaro, and Eddie Sutton from fellow New York bands Agnostic Front, Nuclear Assault, Crumbsuckers and Leeway. Drummer and founder Al Batross left the group after Immaculate Deception was recorded.

Powertrip

By the time their second album, Powertrip, was released, only two original members, singer Tommy and guitarist Glen, were left. The band became far more metallic in style, while retaining a range of musical influences and being more overtly humorous, they abandoned the early hardcore style and featured musicianship by Paul Neider (guitar) and Dave Miranda (drums) in particular.

Before the release of its third album "Here Comes Trouble" on Combat Core / Relativity Records, the group renamed itself Scatterbrain, to circumvent a boycott by conservative record distributors.

Post-Ludichrist

Al Batross (Al Bazin) formed Big Sniff (with releases on both Mint Tone Records and Do iT! Records in Germany) with future members of The Arsons and Kill Your Idols in the 1990s. From 2001 through 2003 Batros played with MDC (Millions of Dead Cops). , Batross continues to live in NYC and has been the sole American member in three all-Japanese bands: The Plungers, The Spunks and Gelatine. Bazin is also a film and video editor.

Original bassist Chuck Valle joined Murphy's Law, and had become an audio engineer (see Six and Violence), but was stabbed to death in California.

Members
Al Batross (aka Alan Bazin), drums
Guy Brogna, bass
Joe Butcher, guitar
Tommy Christ, vocals
Glen Cummings, guitar
Mark Durnex (aka Mark Kanabrocki), guitar
Dave Miranda, drums
Paul Nieder, guitar
Tony Scaglione, drums
Mike Walter, bass
Chuck Valle, bass

Discography
Ludichrist, cassette (1984)
Ludichrist, The Demo, cassette (1985)
There's A Method To Our Madness compilation LP (1985)
CBGB Live "Off the Board" Ludichrist, cassette (1985)
Young White and Well Behaved cassette (1986)
Immaculate Deception (1986)
Scatterbrain, Here Comes Trouble (1988)
Ludichrist and I Mean That! Demo, cassette (1987)
Powertrip (1988)

References

External links
 Ludichrist on MySpace
 Ludichrist - BandToBand.com

Hardcore punk groups from New York (state)
Heavy metal musical groups from New York (state)
Crossover thrash groups